The University of Johannesburg Prize for South African Writing, also known as the UJ Prize, is awarded annually by the University of Johannesburg (UJ) for the best creative works in each of five categories: English, Afrikaans, Zulu, Northern Sotho, and Literary Translation. There are usually two prizes, a main prize and a debut prize, in each category. The prizes are not linked to a specific genre, and each year's prize rewards work published in the previous year. The winner of the main prize in each category receives R70 000, the winner of each debut prize receives R35 000, and the winner of the Literary Translation prize receives R50 000.

The Zulu, Northern Sotho, and Literary Translation prizes were awarded for the first time in 2021, with any work published between 2018 and 2020 eligible for entry. The Afrikaans prize has been awarded since 2001, but was previously called the RAU-Prys vir Skeppende Skyfwerk (RAU Prize for Creative Writing) and located at Rand Afrikaans University (RAU). In 2005, when RAU was merged with other institutions to establish UJ, the name of the prize was changed and an English category was introduced. Marlene van Niekerk and Willem Anker are the only writers to have won the prize thrice (each time for Afrikaans).

Prizes for South African Writing in English

Prizes for South African Writing in Afrikaans

Prizes for Creative Writing in Zulu

Prizes for Creative Writing in Northern Sotho

Prizes for Literary Translation 
The translation prize is awarded for the translation of a literary text from any language into any one of the official South African languages. There is no debut prize for literary translation; instead, there is a prize for the translation of a youth text.

References 

South African literary awards
Fiction awards
Awards established in 2006
2006 establishments in South Africa
South African literary events